Fargo Express is a 1933 American pre-Code Western film directed by Alan James and starring Ken Maynard, Helen Mack and Roy Stewart.

Cast
 Ken Maynard as Ken Benton 
 Helen Mack as Helen Clark 
 Roy Stewart as Sam Goss 
 Paul Fix as Mort Clark 
 William Desmond as Sheriff Joe Thompson 
 Jack Rockwell as Deputy Slim Stratton 
 Claude Payton as Lem - Goss Partner #1 
 William Bailey as Goss Partner #2 
 Joe Rickson as Lynn - Gambler Who Chases Mort

References

Bibliography
 Darby, William. Masters of Lens and Light: A Checklist of Major Cinematographers and Their Feature Films. Scarecrow Press, 1991.

External links
 

1933 films
1933 Western (genre) films
American black-and-white films
American Western (genre) films
Films directed by Alan James
1930s English-language films
1930s American films